Farmland is a town in Monroe Township, Randolph County, in the U.S. state of Indiana. The population was 1,333 at the 2010 census.

History
Farmland was platted in 1852 when the railroad was extended to that point. The town most likely was so named on account of their fertile soil. A post office has been in operation at Farmland since 1853. Farmland was incorporated as a town in 1867.

The Farmland Downtown Historic District was listed on the National Register of Historic Places in 1994.

A sign posted by the state highway department welcomes people to Farmland and notes that it is "The Home of Ansel Toney, The Kite Man".

Geography
Farmland is located at  (40.189000, -85.127102).

Demographics

2010 census
As of the census of 2010, there were 1,333 people, 543 households, and 375 families living in the town. The racial makeup of the town was 97.3% White, 0.2% African American, 1.4% Native American, 0.1% Asian, 0.2% from other races, and 1.0% from two or more races. Hispanic or Latino of any race were 1.1% of the population.

There were 543 households, of which 32.6% had children under the age of 18 living with them, 52.5% were married couples living together, 13.3% had a female householder with no husband present, 3.3% had a male householder with no wife present, and 30.9% were non-families. 26.3% of all households were made up of individuals, and 12.2% had someone living alone who was 65 years of age or older. The average household size was 2.45 and the average family size was 2.94.

The median age in the town was 39.3 years. 24.4% of residents were under the age of 18; 8.1% were between the ages of 18 and 24; 24.8% were from 25 to 44; 27.1% were from 45 to 64; and 15.8% were 65 years of age or older. The gender makeup of the town was 48.0% male and 52.0% female.

2000 census
As of the census of 2000, there were 1,456 people, 573 households, and 414 families living in the town. The racial makeup of the town was 98.49% White, 0.48% Native American, 0.07% Asian, 0.07% from other races, and 0.89% from two or more races. Hispanic or Latino of any race were 0.21% of the population.

There were 573 households, out of which 34.4% had children under the age of 18 living with them, 58.3% were married couples living together, 10.5% had a female householder with no husband present, and 27.7% were non-families. 23.7% of all households were made up of individuals, and 11.2% had someone living alone who was 65 years of age or older. The average household size was 2.54 and the average family size was 3.03.

In the town, the population was spread out, with 28.0% under the age of 18, 6.7% from 18 to 24, 28.4% from 25 to 44, 21.0% from 45 to 64, and 15.9% who were 65 years of age or older. The median age was 36 years. For every 100 females, there were 92.3 males. For every 100 females age 18 and over, there were 86.0 males.

The median income for a household in the town was $36,250, and the median income for a family was $45,000. Males had a median income of $31,795 versus $21,750 for females. The per capita income for the town was $18,405. About 3.4% of families and 6.5% of the population were below the poverty line, including 7.4% of those under age 18 and 3.5% of those age 65 or over.

Education
The town has a lending library, the Farmland Public Library.

References

External links
Town website

Towns in Randolph County, Indiana
Towns in Indiana
1852 establishments in Indiana